Rafael "Ralph" Salamanca Jr. (born July 2, 1980) is the councilmember for the 17th district of the New York City Council.  He is a Democrat. The district includes portions of Concourse Village, East Tremont, Hunts Point, Longwood, Melrose, Morrisania, Port Morris, and West Farms in The Bronx.

Life and career
Salamanca was born and raised in The Bronx to parents from Puerto Rico.  His father worked the docks at the Hunts Point Market while his mother was an administrative worker in healthcare. Salamanca did not finish high school, but did receive his high school diploma equivalency certificate and subsequently earned an associate degree from Monroe College.

A lifelong resident of the South Bronx, Salamanca began his career working as an administrative assistant for a healthcare services provider, and later went on to organize surrounding healthcare issues in both The Bronx and Brooklyn, including in Williamsburg, Brooklyn, with future-New York City Councilmember Antonio Reynoso.

Salamanca was a member of Bronx Community Board 2, where he would advocate for issues in the Hunts Point and Longwood neighborhoods. He eventually became the District Manager for the board, and also served as the President of the 41st Precinct Council. He gained citywide attention for his work as the Community Board Manager for shutting down strip clubs in the community that were havens for criminal activity.

New York City Council
In 2015, Councilwoman Maria del Carmen Arroyo resigned from her seat on the City Council. Salamanca entered the race for the special election to replace her and won a six-way Democratic primary election, with 39% of the vote. He was sworn into office on March 8, 2016.

Salamanca ran again in November 2016 to finish Arroyo's term, won his first full term in 2017, and was re-elected in 2021. Salamanca explored but ultimately did not pursue a candidacy for Bronx Borough President in 2021.

Shooting 
In September 2021, a stray bullet shattered Salamanca's office window while he was inside with constituents. No one was hurt in the incident.

References

External links

1980 births
Puerto Rican people in New York (state) politics
American politicians of Puerto Rican descent
Living people
Monroe College alumni
New York (state) Democrats
New York City Council members
21st-century American politicians
Politicians from the Bronx
Hispanic and Latino American New York City Council members